The Norfolk County Jail was a jail located on Highland Street in Dedham, Massachusetts. Following the creation of Norfolk County in 1792, Timothy Gay deeded land to the county for the creation of his jail next to his tavern on Highland Street in October 1794. Construction began that year but it was not complete until 1795.

It received its first prisoner in February 1795. It housed Jason Fairbanks after his murder conviction, but he escaped. Timothy Gay, Jr. was the jail keeper and was indicted, but acquitted.

It was replaced by a new Norfolk County Jail in 1817.

Notes

References

Works cited

1795 establishments in Massachusetts
1817 disestablishments in Massachusetts
Buildings and structures in Dedham, Massachusetts
History of Dedham, Massachusetts
Defunct prisons in Massachusetts